Jorge Henrique Amaral de Castro known as Jorginho Paulista or just Jorginho (born 20 February 1980) is a former Brazilian footballer who has played as a left-sided defender or midfielder.

Club career

Udinese and loans
Discovered by PSV after 1997 FIFA U-17 World Championship, he joined Udinese on loan in January 1999. As the club run out of non-EU quota, Jorginho was unveiled as new player at the start of 1999–2000 season along with Warley with European Union status.

Jorginho made his debut on 28 November 1999, against Roma as starter, the match Udinese lost 0–2 to Roma at home.

He also moved back to Brazil on loan to Atlético Paranaense and played twice at 2000 Copa do Brasil.

In September 2000, Udinese traveled to Poland for the UEFA Cup match against Polonia Warsaw. But Polish officials discovered that the Portuguese passport of Warley and Alberto were fake. Later Jorginho's fake passport were also discovered . Warley and Jorginho were immediately transferred back to Brazil for Copa João Havelange, where Jorginho Paulista won the champion along with former Brazilian internationals Jorginho.

In June 2001, he was banned for 1 year for Italian football along with teammate Warley, Alejandro Da Silva and Alberto, and 9 other players were also banned from 6 months to 1 year. He was then loaned to Boca Juniors. In early 2002 he left for Cruzeiro to play as the backup of Juan Pablo Sorín.

He then left for São Paulo for a season, which he was injured from November to April.

Botafogo
In mid-2003 he left for Botafogo on loan and finished as Campeonato Brasileiro Série B runner-up.

Jorginho had declared he would like to return to Palmeiras in 2004 season but eventually remain at Botafogo.

Return to Vasco
In April 2005 he returned to Vasco, signing a one-year contract.

In December 2005, he left Vasco.

Mexico
He spent the 2006–07 season at Pumas Morelos, the feeder team of Pumas de la UNAM. He played twice at Primera División A, on round 2 and 3 of Apertura 2006.

Late career
He then trailed at Russia to join Lokomotiv Moskva but failed to form a contract., In May 2007, he signed a contract with Paulista until the end of Campeonato Brasileiro Série B 2007. He was the regular of Paulista but lost his place in the second half of the season.

He then trailed at Boavista, Dalian and Real Salt Lake.

In February 2009 he joined Bragantino for 2009 Campeonato Paulista. At the start of Campeonato Brasileiro Série B he left for Campinense, the league rival of Bragantino. He was released in June 2009.

In February 2010, he trialed at Avaí but failed to get a contract. A year later, he was signed by Ceilândia, a team from Federal District.

After a few months with Marcílio Dias in 2012 Campeonato Catarinense (1 appearance), he left for Esporte Clube Flamengo of Piauí state.

International career
With Brazil, Jorginho won the 1997 FIFA U-17 World Championship along with Fábio, Fábio Pinto, Diogo Rincón, Matuzalém, Ronaldinho and Geovanni.

Honours

Club
 Vasco
2000 Copa Mercosur
Copa João Havelange

International
 Brazil
1997 FIFA U-17 World Championship

References

External links
 
 Profile at futpedia.globo.com 
 Profile at Legaseriea.it 
 

Brazilian footballers
Brazilian expatriate footballers
Campeonato Brasileiro Série A players
Eredivisie players
Serie A players
Argentine Primera División players
Sociedade Esportiva Palmeiras players
PSV Eindhoven players
Udinese Calcio players
Club Athletico Paranaense players
CR Vasco da Gama players
Boca Juniors footballers
Cruzeiro Esporte Clube players
São Paulo FC players
Botafogo de Futebol e Regatas players
Club Universidad Nacional footballers
Paulista Futebol Clube players
Clube Atlético Bragantino players
Campinense Clube players
Ceilândia Esporte Clube players
Association football fullbacks
Expatriate footballers in the Netherlands
Expatriate footballers in Italy
Expatriate footballers in Argentina
Expatriate footballers in Mexico
Brazilian expatriate sportspeople in the Netherlands
Brazilian expatriate sportspeople in Italy
Brazilian expatriate sportspeople in Argentina
Brazilian expatriate sportspeople in Mexico
Footballers from São Paulo
1980 births
Living people